Tengku Mushadad bin Tengku Mohamed (born 7 August 1984) is a professional footballer who is playing for Tanjong Pagar United and the Singapore national football team. He is currently also a coach with a youth football academy in Singapore named JSSL. 

He can play either as a defensive midfielder or as a defender.

Club career
Tengku has previously played for S.League clubs Young Lions, Home United FC, Gombak United and Balestier Khalsa.

International career
He made his debut for the Singapore against Japan on 17 November 2004.

Honours

International
Singapore
ASEAN Football Championship: 2004

References

External links

Singaporean footballers
Singapore international footballers
Living people
1984 births
Home United FC players
Young Lions FC players
Gombak United FC players
Balestier Khalsa FC players
Tanjong Pagar United FC players
Singapore Premier League players
Association football midfielders
Footballers at the 2006 Asian Games
Singaporean people of Malay descent
Southeast Asian Games bronze medalists for Singapore
Southeast Asian Games medalists in football
Competitors at the 2007 Southeast Asian Games
Asian Games competitors for Singapore